This article provide a List of National Historic Landmarks in Rhode Island. There are 45 National Historic Landmarks (NHLs) in Rhode Island. In addition there are two National Park Service administered or affiliated areas of national historic importance in the state.

Rhode Island's National Historic Landmarks are distributed across all five of Rhode Island's counties.

|}

References

External links
 

Rhode Island
 
National Historic Landmarks